William Franklin (1731–1813) was the last Royal Governor of New Jersey and son of Benjamin Franklin.

William Franklin may also refer to:

William Temple Franklin (1760–1823), William Franklin's son and Benjamin Franklin's grandson
William Franklin (Ireland), Irish Protestant leader of the 17th century
William Franklin (singer) (1906–?), opera singer
William B. Franklin (1823–1903), Union Army General during the American Civil War
William Franklin (Assistant Bishop of Peterborough) (1916–1998), British Anglican bishop, also of the Episcopal Diocese of Colombia
William Edwin Franklin (born 1930), Bishop of the Roman Catholic Diocese of Davenport
Webb Franklin (William Webster Franklin, born 1941), U.S. Representative from Mississippi
William Franklin (gridiron football) (born 1985), wide receiver for the Oakland Raiders
Will Franklin (basketball) (born 1949), retired basketball power forward
Bill Franklin (1884–1968), Australian rules footballer
William Henry Franklin (1911–1940), Royal Air Force fighter pilot

See also
William Franklyn (disambiguation)
William Francklin (1763–1839), orientalist
William Frankland (disambiguation)